Bruce Coulter (November 19, 1927 – June 5, 2018) was a Canadian football player and coach. He played ten seasons for the Montreal Alouettes, winning the Grey Cup in 1949. He then went on to coach 29 seasons for the Bishop's Gaiters.  He was inducted into the Canadian Football Hall of Fame in 1997.

Coulter was also a curler, and represented Quebec at the 1957 Macdonald Brier.

References

1927 births
2018 deaths
Players of Canadian football from Ontario
Canadian football defensive backs
Toronto Varsity Blues football players
Montreal Alouettes players
McGill Redbirds football coaches
Academic staff of McGill University
Academic staff of Bishop's University
Canadian Football Hall of Fame inductees
Canadian football people from Toronto
Ontario Rugby Football Union players
Toronto Balmy Beach Beachers players
Bishop's Gaiters football coaches
Canadian football quarterbacks
Canadian male curlers
Curlers from Quebec